Andreas Andersson (born April 9, 1979, in Falun, Sweden) is a Swedish former professional ice hockey goaltender.

Playing career
Andersson was a long-time backup goaltender in HV71 and was never able to establish himself as a starting goalie for any team in Sweden. He started his career with Falu IF in division 1 but soon joined HV71's youth team. From 1996 to 2000 he played in 20 games for HV71's senior team and five games for the youth team. During the time he was also selected for the Swedish nation youth team and played in five games in the World Junior Championships.

From season 2000–01 to 2004–05 he played with IF Troja/Ljungby in the Swedish second tier division, HockeyAllsvenskan. He continued with two seasons with Rögle BK and in 2007 signed a two-year deal with HV71. In season 2007–08, on February 12, Andersson scored an empty net goal making him the sixth goaltender to score a goal in Elitserien.

Awards
 Elitserien playoff winner with HV71 in 2008.
 Elitserien playoff silver medal with HV71 in 2009.

Career statistics

Regular season

Statistics as of end of Elitserien season 2009–10

Post-season

Statistics as of end of Elitserien season 2008–09

References

External links 

1979 births
HV71 players
IF Troja/Ljungby players
Linköping HC players
Living people
Anaheim Ducks draft picks
Rögle BK players
Södertälje SK players
Swedish ice hockey goaltenders
People from Falun
Sportspeople from Dalarna County